Valrico is a census-designated place (CDP) in Hillsborough County, Florida, United States. The population was 35,545 at the 2010 census, up from 6,582 at the 2000 census.

History 
Before the Civil War, the area was known as Long Pond and consisted of several cotton plantations. It was renamed Valrico, meaning "rich valley" in Spanish, in the 1880s when William G. Tousey, a philosophy professor from Tufts College, purchased property in the area. In 1890, an influx of immigrants arrived, following the construction of the Florida Central and Peninsular Railroad through the area.

When the railroad was completed, Tousey began building up the community with retail stores, streets, and a bank. In 1893, Mr. Bryan built a steam mill at Valrico station. In 1895, a major freeze halted these developments, and the population began to dwindle. Nonetheless, the town continued, and a schoolhouse was completed in 1896. The population continued to fall, from 100 people in 1893 to only 50 in 1911.

This setback did not deter local landowners from pushing forward with the town's development. From 1910 to 1914 Judge Hamner, Governor Van Sant, D. Humbird, W.H., S.C. Phipps and W.F. Miller started an improvement project along Hopewell Road, later designated SR 60. W.F. Miller, serving as president of the Valrico Improvement Association, raised $3,500 to erect the Valrico Civic Center, now known as the James McCabe Theater. The area's first general store was opened by Lovett Brandon in 1912.

Valrico once again suffered a major blow during the stock market crash of 1929, which saw nearly every business in the town shut down. Not until the mid-1950s did the town begin to see growth again, primarily due to the connection of SR 60 to Tampa's Adamo Drive, placing Valrico right along a major Florida thoroughfare.

Geography 
Valrico is located in east-central Hillsborough County at  (27.940774, -82.242551). It is bordered to the west by Brandon, to the southwest by Bloomingdale, and to the south by FishHawk.

Demographics 

As of the census of 2000, there were 6,582 people, 2,632 households, and 1,826 families residing in the community. The racial makeup of the community was 89.32% White, 3.21% African American, 0.49% Native American, 1.47% Asian, 3.57% from other races, and 1.94% from two or more races. Hispanic or Latino of any race were 12.82% of the population.

There were 2,632 households, out of which 29.4% had children under the age of 18 living with them, 57.0% were married couples living together, 8.4% had a female householder with no husband present, and 30.6% were non-families. 25.8% of all households were made up of individuals, and 14.4% had someone living alone who was 65 years of age or older. The average household size was 2.49 and the average family size was 2.99.

In the community, the population was spread out, with 24.2% under the age of 18, 6.5% from 18 to 24, 29.1% from 25 to 44, 22.5% from 45 to 64, and 17.7% who were 65 years of age or older. The median age was 39 years. For every 100 females, there were 95.0 males. For every 100 females age 18 and over, there were 93.1 males.

The median income for a household in the community was $98,700. and the median income for a family was $105,475. About 3.8% of families and 7.5% of the population were below the poverty line, including 7.3% of those under age 18 and 8.4% of those age 65 or over.

Education

Public high schools 
Bloomingdale High School
Durant High School
Newsome High School

Public middle schools 
Barrington Middle School
Mulrennan Middle School 
Randall Middle School
Burns Middle School

Public elementary schools 
Alafia Elementary School
Buckhorn Elementary School
Cimino Elementary School
Lithia Springs Elementary 
Nelson Elementary School
Valrico Elementary School
Brooker Elementary School

Private schools 
Bell Shoals Baptist Academy PK-8
F.I.S.H.(Home Schoolers)
Foundation Christian Academy PK-12
Grace Christian School K-12
Interactive Education Academy K-12
Trinity Christian Academy 2-12

Notable people
Jahleel Addae, professional football player
Erin Andrews, TV personality
Howie Auer, professional football player
Jay Ayres, professional soccer player
Glenn Beck, radio personality
Melissa Beck, comedian
Zach Bonner, philanthropist
Michael Bradley, professional golfer
Chad Bratzke, professional football player
Jeff Curchin, football player
Jimmy Del Ray, professional wrestler
Tyler Danish, professional baseball player
Jose Gomez, professional soccer player
Matt Good, musician
Agiye Hall, college football player
Garry Hancock, professional baseball player
Sterling Hofrichter, professional football player
Albert Journeay, professional football player
Carl Marchese, racecar driver
Alissa Nutting, author
Jeremy Rosado, singer
Steve Runge, professional golfer
Derek Smethurst, professional soccer and football player
Ronda Storms, politician
Colleen Walker, professional golfer
Peter Tom Willis, professional football player
William Martin Willis, musician
Will Worth, football player

References

External links 
Valrico's profile from city-data.com

Census-designated places in Hillsborough County, Florida
Census-designated places in Florida